Ri Man-chol (born 19 June 1978) is a North Korean former footballer. He represented North Korea on at least eight occasions between 2000 and 2002.

Career statistics

International

References

1978 births
Living people
North Korean footballers
North Korea international footballers
Association football defenders
Footballers at the 1998 Asian Games
Asian Games competitors for North Korea